Bethesda Softworks LLC is an American video game publisher based in Rockville, Maryland. The company was founded by Christopher Weaver in 1986 as a division of Media Technology Limited, and in 1999 became a subsidiary of ZeniMax Media. In its first fifteen years, it was a video game developer and self-published its titles. In 2001, Bethesda spun off its own in-house development team into Bethesda Game Studios, and Bethesda Softworks retained only its publishing function. In 2021, Microsoft purchased ZeniMax, maintaining that the company will continue to operate as a separate business.

History

1986–1994: Early years 

Prior to founding Bethesda Softworks, Christopher Weaver was a technology forecaster and a communications engineer in the television and cable industries. After finishing grad school, he was hired by the American Broadcasting Company, where he wrote several memos about "the importance of alternative distribution systems and how satellites and broadband networks would impact network television", which landed him the position of manager of technology forecasting. After multiple national magazines quoted his articles on "the exciting prospects for cabled distribution systems", he was recruited by the National Cable Television Association and created its Office of Science and Technology. In that capacity, he helped design high-speed data communication systems for several member companies of the association. Eventually, Weaver became the chief engineer for the United States House Subcommittee on Communications, where he influenced legislation that affected the telephone, television, and cable industries.

In the meantime, Weaver had also founded VideoMagic Laboratories with a friend from the Architecture Machine Group at the Massachusetts Institute of Technology (MIT). They had put together a 400-page business plan to commercialize their prior lab work and, through the Industrial Liaison Office at MIT, they came in contact with a wealthy family in the electronics industry that provided VideoMagic with venture capital. The company developed several technologies, including location-based entertainment systems, that Weaver deemed "radical and cutting-edge" but put out prematurely, causing little commercial return. The funding family, having financial issues of its own, dropped out of the venture and sold off some of VideoMagic's properties. After leaving the House Subcommittee some years later, Weaver established Media Technology Associates, Limited (renamed Media Technology Limited in March 1988) in June 1981. The company provided engineering and media consulting for private companies and government organizations. Media Technology had offices in Maryland and New York.

At Media Technology, Weaver worked with Ed Fletcher, an electrical engineer with whom he had collaborated at VideoMagic, on video games for LaserDisc-based systems until that industry crashed in 1984. While waiting for potential new contracts, the company acquired an Amiga personal computer with which the two began to experiment. Fletcher was a fan of American football and suggested that they develop a football video game for the system, which Weaver supported despite no interest in the sport. Fletcher developed the game, later named Gridiron!, out of Weaver's house in Bethesda, Maryland, in roughly nine months. His initial approach was to use lookup tables to map player inputs to predetermined outcomes. Weaver disliked this concept and, at his behest, he and Fletcher devised a more realistic, physics-based system. No artists or animators were involved in the project, which gave the game a sub-par graphical presentation for the time.

Weaver formed Bethesda Softworks "on the proverbial kitchen table" of his Bethesda home as a division of Media Technology on June 28, 1986. The formation was described as an experiment "to see if the PC market was a viable place to develop games". Weaver originally named the company "Softwerke" but found that the name was taken by a company based in Virginia. Weaver and the owner of that company agreed to co-exist rather than fight over the title, and Weaver changed the name of his company to Bethesda Softworks. He had considered creating a unique name, such as one using the word "magic" after a quote from Arthur C. Clarke, but "Bethesda Softworks" ultimately stuck. Gridiron! was released as the company's first game later in 1986 for the Amiga, Atari ST, and Commodore 64 systems. The initial release of a few hundred copies distributed in plastic bags was sold out within one week, to the surprise of Bethesda Softworks.

Early games scored respectably in the gaming press. Electronic Arts was working on the first John Madden Football, and hired Bethesda to help finish developing it, and acquired distribution rights for future versions of Gridiron!. The case was resolved out of court.

Courtney Cox (later known for her role in the sitcom Friends) worked at the publisher briefly in the 1980s.

In 1990, the company moved from Bethesda to Rockville, Maryland. By February 1993, the company employed 40 people.

The first game Bethesda published and developed, based on a popular film franchise, was The Terminator for the MS-DOS. The title was released in July 1991, coinciding with the theatrical release of the film Terminator 2: Judgment Day.

1994–1997: Arena, Company expansion, The 10th Planet 

In 1994, the company released its best-known project at the time, The Elder Scrolls: Arena. The game, the first in The Elder Scrolls role-playing video game series was the work of Programmer Julian Lefay, Director and Producer Vijay Lakshman as well as others. Several sequels have been released since.

Between 1994 and 1997, Bethesda was developing a space combat game titled The 10th Planet. It was a collaboration between Bethesda and Roland Emmerich's Centropolis Entertainment. During development, Centropolis chose to stop working on the game due to the company's commitments to its films. The project was never released.

In 1995, Bethesda Softworks acquired Noctropolis developer Flashpoint Productions, which Brent Erickson had founded in 1992.

In 1997, Bethesda acquired XL Translab, a Washington, D.C., graphics company that stemmed from the Catholic University School of Architecture and Planning. It was moved to Bethesda Softworks' Rockville headquarters. XL Translab had previously done work for PBS and Fortune 500 companies. By 1996, the company had become the third-biggest player in the privately held PC publishing industry after LucasArts and Interplay Entertainment with 75 employees by that year and revenues of $25 million by 1997.

1997–1999: Wings of Gold, Daggerfall 

In June/July 97, Bethesda announced a partnership with CBS Enterprises to produce the first-ever true companion PC series of games for the television series Pensacola: Wings of Gold. By December 1997, the first CD-ROM game was still in production.

For The Elder Scrolls II: Daggerfall, Bethesda developed XnGine, a 3D game engine, replacing the raycasting engine used for Arena. The engine was used in The Terminator: Future Shock, Terminator: SkyNET, Daggerfall, and XCar: Experimental Racing. In 1997 and 1998, Bethesda released two The Elder Scrolls spin-offs based on Daggerfall code—Battlespire and Redguard—neither of which enjoyed the success of Daggerfall and Arena. The downturn in sales was not limited just to The Elder Scrolls franchise, and the company considered filing for bankruptcy as a result. Battlespire and Redguard were the last games to use XnGine.

In October 1999, Pete Hines joined Bethesda to head up its marketing department, running it as what he described as a one-man band. At the start of his tenure, the company had employed around 15 people in its Rockville headquarters.

1999–2004: ZeniMax, Christopher Weaver lawsuit 
In 1999, Weaver and Robert A. Altman formed the holding company ZeniMax Media. In an interview with Edge, he described the company as being a top-level administrative structure rather than a "parent company" for its holdings, explaining that "ZeniMax and Bethesda for all intents and purposes are one thing. Bethesda has no accounting department, we have no finance, we have no legal, our legal department [and] our financial department is ZeniMax, we all operate as one unit." ZeniMax acquired Media Technology in July 1999 and Bethesda Softworks was reorganized as a division of ZeniMax. By then Bethesda employed nearly 100 people.

In 2001, Bethesda Game Studios was established, changing Bethesda Softworks to being a publishing brand of ZeniMax Media.

In 2002, Weaver stopped being employed by ZeniMax. He later filed a lawsuit against ZeniMax, claiming he was ousted by his new business partners after giving them access to his brand and was owed  in severance pay. ZeniMax filed counterclaims and moved to dismiss the case, claiming Weaver had gone through emails of other employees to find evidence. This dismissal was later vacated on appeal, and the parties settled out of court. Weaver remained a major shareholder in the company: as of 2007, he said that he still owned 33% of ZeniMax's stock. Providence Equity bought 25% of ZeniMax's stock in late 2007, and an additional stake in 2010.

2004–2015: Fallout, capital increase, publishing expansions 
In 2007, the Fallout franchise was acquired by Bethesda Softworks from Interplay Entertainment and the development of Fallout 3 was handed over to Bethesda Game Studios. Fallout 3 was released on October 28, 2008. Five downloadable content packs for Fallout 3 were released in the year following its release—Operation: Anchorage, The Pitt, Broken Steel, Point Lookout, and Mothership Zeta. Obsidian Entertainment's new Fallout title, Fallout: New Vegas was published in 2010. Fallout 4 was released on November 10, 2015.

Between 2004 and 2008, ZeniMax's subsidiaries Mud Duck Productions and Vir2L Studios released 4 bowling games for various platforms, AMF Bowling 2004, AMF Xtreme Bowling 2006, AMF Bowling World Lanes and AMF Bowling Pinbusters!.

In January 2006, Bethesda acquired the rights to the Star Trek series of video games. The first game published by the company was Star Trek: Encounters, released in 2006.

In September 2009, Bethesda filed a lawsuit against Interplay Entertainment, after being unsatisfied with Interplay's development of the Fallout massively multiplayer online game project. Bethesda stopped funding the project, and Interplay was forced to abandon work on it.

Between 2007 and 2010, Bethesda raised  in new capital from Providence Equity Partners to fund expansion efforts. In February 2008, the company opened a European publishing arm in London, named ZeniMax Europe, to distribute titles throughout UK/EMEA territories under the Bethesda Softworks brand. This was followed in by opening publishing offices in Tokyo, Frankfurt, Paris, Eindhoven, Hong Kong, Sydney and Moscow in 2008, 2010, 2012, 2013 and 2018 respectively.

On June 24, 2009, ZeniMax Media acquired id Software, whose titles, including Rage, would be published by Bethesda Softworks. Between 2009 and 2012, the company expanded publishing operations, with games from independent third-party developers such as Rebellion Developments's Rogue Warrior, Artificial Mind and Movement's Wet, Splash Damage's Brink, and inXile's Hunted: The Demon's Forge.

In 2011, Bethesda filed a lawsuit against Mojang (makers of Minecraft) for using Scrolls as the name of a new digital card game, which sounded too close to The Elder Scrolls trademarked by Bethesda.

In the early 2010s, Bethesda Softworks published games such as Dishonored, Wolfenstein: The New Order, and The Evil Within.

2015–2020: Going mobile, Doom reboot and Fallout 76 controversy 
In the mid-2010s, Bethesda began to experiment with new kinds of games, releasing Fallout Shelter, its first mobile, free-to-play game in the summer of 2015. A year later, it released a reboot of id Software's Doom, after several years of development as a failed attempt to produce a sequel to Doom 3. Later that year, Zen Studios released virtual pinball adaptations of three games that Bethesda released during the decade thus far (The Elder Scrolls V: Skyrim, Fallout 4 and the 2016 reboot of Doom) as the Bethesda Pinball collection for its pinball games. Bethesda went on to release two more free-to-play mobile games based on The Elder Scrolls series, a card battle game titled The Elder Scrolls: Legends in 2017 and a first-person role-playing game titled The Elder Scrolls: Blades in 2019.

When Nintendo unveiled its new hybrid console, the Nintendo Switch, Bethesda expressed support for it and released ports of The Elder Scrolls V: Skyrim and Doom for that system in November 2017. A year later, it also ported Fallout Shelter, and has future plans to do the same for its two Elder Scrolls mobile games.

In late 2018, Bethesda announced and released its first massively multiplayer online game, Fallout 76, a prequel to the Fallout series. Upon its initial release, it was given mixed reviews for its poor quality and was embroiled in several other controversies, including problems with tie-in products and a data breach.

The following year saw Bethesda announce sequels to Rage and Doom, Rage 2 and Doom Eternal. The former was released on May 14.

In November 2019, Human Head Studios shut down while Bethesda established a new studio, Roundhouse Studios, offering all Human Head employees a position within it.

2020–present: Microsoft's acquisition of ZeniMax 

In 2016, Bethesda had released its own application launcher for PC. Fallout 76 and Fallout Shelter were exclusives to the launcher before eventually released on Steam. In 2022, Bethesda shut down the launcher. The launcher was mostly met with negative reception. PC Gamer said that "Bethesda's launcher seems to be designed more as a pretty interface to purchase Bethesda's games than a way of managing them. [...] the client feels more like a store than anything."

Games published 

 Wayne Gretzky Hockey (1988–1992)
 Terminator series (1990–1996)
 The Elder Scrolls series (1994–present)
 Symbiocom (1998)
 Zero Critical (1998)
 IHRA Drag Racing series (2000–2006)
 Pirates of the Caribbean series (2003–2006)
 Call of Cthulhu: Dark Corners of the Earth (2005)
 Star Trek series (2006–2007)
 Fallout series (2008–present)
 Wet (2009)
 Rogue Warrior (2009)
 Rage series (2010–2019)
 Brink (2011)
 Hunted: The Demon's Forge (2011)
 Dishonored series (2012–2017)
 Doom series (2012–present)
 Wolfenstein series (2014–present)
 The Evil Within series (2014–2017)
 Prey (2017)
 Deathloop (2021)
 Ghostwire: Tokyo (2022)
 Hi-Fi Rush (2023) 
 Redfall (2023)
 Starfield (2023)

Controversies

Conflicts with other developers
In 2001, Bethesda Softworks published Echelon in the United States, a video game developed by the Russian development studio Madia. Madia stated that Bethesda did not pay for boxed sales of the game, as was allegedly specified in the contract. The developers at Madia wrote an open letter to Bethesda in which they have detailed the affair, but Bethesda refused to pay. In the end Madia decided not to take it to court. Pete Hines, VP of PR at Bethesda, stated that Madia presented misleading allegations about Bethesda's role as publisher of Echelon in North America and that Bethesda had no contractual obligations to Madia.

Bethesda Softworks and ZeniMax Media have been accused of attempting a hostile acquisition of Human Head Studios, as well as a successful hostile acquisition of Arkane Studios prior to that. According to a report from IGN, ZeniMax started purposefully failing Human Head's project milestones so that they would not get paid, allowing ZeniMax to buy the company at a reduced rate. They were accused of doing the same thing with Arkane Studios, although in Arkane's case the studio gave in and allowed themselves to be bought. The failed hostile acquisition of Human Head Studios led to cancellation of Human Head's Prey 2, according to the report.

Bethesda also pressured developer No Matter Games to change the name of their game Prey for the Gods to Praey for the Gods, as Bethesda felt the initial title infringed upon the trademark of their own game, Prey. Pete Hines, who serves as Bethesda's VP of marketing, said Bethesda would have risked losing their Prey trademark if they had not requested the title change.

Lawsuits 
In September 2009, Bethesda Softworks sued Interplay Entertainment over Fallout trademark infringement. After a lengthy legal battle the lawsuit was settled in January 2012, with Interplay receiving  while Bethesda Softworks gained the right to develop a Fallout massively multiplayer online game, as well as the rights to Fallout, Fallout 2 and Fallout Tactics after December 31, 2013.

In September 2011, Bethesda's parent company, ZeniMax Media, filed a lawsuit against Mojang, claiming that Mojang's planned trademark of the title Scrolls infringed upon Bethesda's trademark of The Elder Scrolls series. On October 18, Markus Persson announced that Mojang had won the interim injunction, but that Bethesda still had the option to file an appeal. In March 2012, Mojang and Bethesda reached a settlement, in which Mojang would not trademark Scrolls, but Bethesda would not contest Mojang's naming of Scrolls, so long as it would not be a direct competitor against The Elder Scrolls.

In 2018, Bethesda Softworks sued Behaviour Interactive, the company responsible for developing Fallout Shelter, for appearing to copy the game's design onto a tie-in mobile game for the Westworld franchise. The issue was settled with undisclosed terms, allowing Bethesda to drop the lawsuit.

Fallout 76 

Bethesda came under fire in 2018 following the release of Fallout 76, which was met with generally unfavorable reviews for its numerous bugs and glitches, gameplay design, and absence of human non-player characters (NPCs). Additionally, the game's special edition received criticism from buyers for advertising the inclusion of a canvas duffel bag, for which Bethesda ultimately substituted a nylon bag. In response, Bethesda initially stated that they would not take any remedial action. After further backlash from fans and customers, Bethesda stated that the bag had been altered "due to unavailability of materials" and compensated customers by offering free in-game currency equating to $5.00. Bethesda's actions provoked negative reactions from buyers for the publisher having failed to notify them beforehand and for the amount of compensation offered. Critics also noted that Bethesda's official website had only changed the description of the bag from "canvas" to "nylon" following customer complaints, while the promotional image of the special edition continued to label the bag as "canvas". Fans were further angered when it was revealed that a different canvas bag had been given by Bethesda to online influencers.

On December 3, 2018, Bethesda revealed that they would produce canvas bags for owners of the Power Armor edition. On December 5, 2018, customers who had submitted support tickets in order to receive the canvas bag had their personal information revealed as a result of a data breach in Bethesda's support system, exposing ticket details to viewing and editing by other users. Bethesda announced that the breach occurred as a result of "an error with our customer support website" and they would investigate the incident. The publisher also explained that the only details leaked would have been those that the support site had requested, rather than any credit card numbers or passwords. Customers reported having received their canvas bags by June 2019.

Notes

References

External links 
 

1986 establishments in Maryland
1999 mergers and acquisitions
American companies established in 1986
American corporate subsidiaries
Companies based in Rockville, Maryland
Video game companies based in Maryland
Video game companies established in 1986
Video game development companies
Video game publishers
ZeniMax Media